Eganaivayal  is a village in the  
Aranthangirevenue block of Pudukkottai district, Tamil Nadu, India.

Demographics 

As per the 2001 census, Eganaivayal had a total population of  
1752 with 879 males and 873 females. Out of the total population 1184 people were literate.

References

Villages in Pudukkottai district